Jörg Hotz (born 28 October 1951) is a Swiss sailor. He competed in the Flying Dutchman event at the 1976 Summer Olympics.

References

External links
 

1951 births
Living people
Swiss male sailors (sport)
Olympic sailors of Switzerland
Sailors at the 1976 Summer Olympics – Flying Dutchman
Place of birth missing (living people)